Senator Bishop may refer to:

Charles Bishop (Alabama politician) (fl. 1980s–2010s), Alabama State Senate
Click Bishop (born 1957), Alaska State Senate
Dan Bishop (born 1964), North Carolina State Senate
Isaac T. Bishop (1844–1920), Wisconsin State Senate
Isaac W. Bishop (c. 1804–?), New York State Senate
Mark Bishop (born 1954), Australian State Senate
Mike Bishop (politician) (born 1967), Michigan State Senate
Neil S. Bishop (1903–1989), Maine State Senate
Phanuel Bishop (1739–1812), Massachusetts State Senate
Robert R. Bishop (1834–1910), Massachusetts State Senate
Sanford Bishop (born 1947), Georgia State Senate
W. E. Bishop (1915–1990), Florida State Senate
William D. Bishop (1827–1904), Connecticut State Senate
William S. Bishop (1800s–1863), New York State Senate